Anthony S. Horacek (born February 3, 1967) is a Canadian former professional ice hockey left winger who played in the National Hockey League (NHL) with the Philadelphia Flyers and Chicago Blackhawks.

Playing career
Horacek had his best game as a professional on December 30, 1989. In a game at the Great Western Forum against the Los Angeles Kings, his hat trick helped the Flyers to a 6–3 win.

Coaching career
He recently accepted a head coaching position at Lebanon Valley College in Annville, Pennsylvania. He currently coaches the Midget 16U AAA Palmyra Black Knights

Career statistics

References

External links
 

1967 births
Living people
Canadian ice hockey left wingers
Chicago Blackhawks players
Cincinnati Cyclones (IHL) players
Hershey Bears players
Ice hockey people from Vancouver
Indianapolis Ice players
Kamloops Blazers players
Kelowna Wings players
Philadelphia Flyers draft picks
Philadelphia Flyers players
Spokane Chiefs players
Utah Grizzlies (AHL) players